Tenaga is a genus of moths belonging to the family Tineidae.

Species
This genus includes the following species:
Tenaga nigripunctella (Haworth, 1828)
Tenaga pomiliella  Clemens, 1862
Tenaga rhenania  (Petersen, 1962)

References
Clemens, 1862. Proceedings of the entomological Society of Philadelphia 1: 136. By monotypy.

Tineidae
Tineidae genera